Mike "Zappy" Zapolin is an American entrepreneur who is considered a pioneer in the domain name industry. He has created Internet brands that have included Music.com, Beer.com, Computer.com, Creditcards.com, Diamond.com and PrescriptionDrugs.com. He is a public speaker and also the creator of the eBusiness elective offered at Harvard Business School. Zapolin is currently the CEO of Zappy Incorporated, a cannabis development company.

Zapolin was in direct marketing before purchasing domain names as an investment. He worked in infomercials and was even interviewed by Katie Couric on The Today Show. Zapolin began purchasing domain names in popular categories such as Beer.com – which he purchased for $80,000 – later selling it for $7 million. He also purchased Diamond.com for $300,000 and later sold it for $7.5 million. Both sales are listed among the top prices paid for domain names. During this time he was one of three people running the domain name investment company Internet Real Estate Group.

Zapolin is also a filmmaker. He directed the documentary film with Deepak Chopra and Michelle RodriguezThe Reality of Truth.

Zappy was the winner of the Amsterdam Film Festival’s Van Gogh award for Documentary Directing, now having over 1.5 million views on Youtube and being available on Amazon Prime and Gaia.

Mike Zapolin also is co-founder of Documercial Group, a multimedia company that captures process and protocols in photos and video for different products and services brands to create content for causes and projects that help to make a more conscious world.

See also

 List of most expensive domain names

References

External links
 Mike "Zappy" Zapolin official website
 The Reality of Truth documentary
 http://lexington.wickedlocal.com/news/20160907/michael-zappy-zapolins-documentary-focuses-on-hallucinatory-experience

21st-century American businesspeople
Living people
American technology executives
Date of birth missing (living people)
Place of birth missing (living people)
Year of birth missing (living people)